Marcelo Ramón Pereda Saro (1897–1986) was a Spanish-Mexican actor, screenwriter, film producer and film director. He was married to the actresses María Antonieta Pons and Adriana Lamar. He appeared in the 1930 Spanish-language version of the revue film Paramount on Parade.

Selected filmography

Actor
 Resurrection (1931)
 Contrabando (1931)
 Carne de Cabaret (1931)
 Sanctuary (1933)
 The Crying Woman (1933)
 Women of Today (1936)
 Beautiful Mexico (1938)
 The Hawk (1940)
 Romance en Puerto Rico (1962)

Director
 María Cristina (1951)
 It Happened in Mexico (1958)

References

Bibliography
 Rogelio Agrasánchez. Guillermo Calles: A Biography of the Actor and Mexican Cinema Pioneer. McFarland, 2010.

External links

1897 births
1986 deaths
Mexican male film actors
Spanish male film actors
Mexican film producers
Spanish film producers
Spanish screenwriters
Spanish male writers
Male screenwriters
Mexican film directors
Spanish film directors
Spanish emigrants to Mexico
20th-century Mexican screenwriters
20th-century Mexican male writers